Josh Maree (born 26 April 1995) is a Lebanon international rugby league footballer who plays as a  forward for Wentworthville United in the Ron Massey Cup.

Background
Maree is of Lebanese descent.

Playing career

Club career
Maree has played for Wentworthville United in the Sydney Shield.

International career
In 2022 Maree was named in the Lebanon squad for the 2021 Rugby League World Cup.

He made his World Cup debut in October 2022 against New Zealand in Warrington.

References

External links
Lebanon profile
Cronulla Caringbah Sharks profile

1995 births
Living people
South Sydney Rabbitohs players
Rugby league locks
Lebanon national rugby league team players